Peace and Democracy may refer to:

Peace and Democracy Party (Turkey), a Turkish political party
Peace and Democracy Movement, a political party in Northern Cyprus

See also
Alliance for Peace and Democracy (disambiguation)
Party for Democracy and Peace, a South Korean political party
Democratic peace theory, a political theory
Territorial peace theory, a theory that peace brings democracy